The Japanese manga series Sōten Kōro is written by , adapted from an original story by . It has been serialized in the seinen manga magazine Weekly Morning by Kodansha from October 1994 to November 2005. Sōten Kōro’s story is based loosely on the events taking place in Three Kingdoms period of China during the life of the last Chancellor of the Eastern Han Dynasty, Cao Cao (155 – March 15, 220), who also serves as the main character. A consistent theme throughout the story is Cao Cao’s perpetual desire to break China and its people away from its old systems and ways of thinking and initiate a focus on pragmatism over empty ideals. This often puts him at odds with the prevalent customs and notions of Confucianism and those that support them. In 1998, manga won the 22nd Kodansha Manga Award in the general category.

Total 409 individual chapters have been collected in 36 tankōbon and are released by Kodansha.The first volume of Sōten Kōro was released on October 23, 1995 and last thirty-sixth volume was released on January 23, 2006. It has been also collected in 18  from December 12, 2000 to December 12, 2006 and 12  with English title "Beyond the heavens" from May 5, 2009 to October 23, 2009.

The manga series has also adopted into an anime series by anime studio Madhouse in 2009. Total 26 episodes are aired From April 7, 2009 to September 30, 2009 by television network NTV.



Volume list

References 

Soten Koro